6. Cadde (literally meaning "Sixth Street") is a Turkish alternative rock group formed by MTV EMA winner Emre Aydın and Onur Ela in 2002 in İzmir.

They published demo recordings for two songs, Rüyamdaki aptal kadin (Foolish Woman in my Dream) and Tesadüfen (By Chance) on the internet. The group went through major transforming during the years, with changing band members, the final set-up with Onur Ela applied for the musical competition Sing Your Song, which they won. This made them possible to record their first professional album, produced by Haluk Kurosman and published by Universal Music Turkey in 2003. The recording was done in Istanbul in a month's time, while all-round production of the album took 2,5 months. The first single from the album was Sabuha, previously sung by such arabesk performers like Ibrahim Tatlises. Sabuha came to life by one of the tasks the jury of Sing Your Song assigned to the participants, namely that each band had to cover a song outside of their own musical genre. The song was refurbished by 6. Cadde from a different musical approach, changing its style and arrangements, in less than 15 minutes, as they had forgotten about the task and hurriedly recorded Sabuha for next day's competition shooting. Later the song was re-recorded for the album. In an interview Kurosman gave away that the 6. Cadde album was the rough mix of studio recordings, previously prepared for radio promotion, because his computer's hard disk became damaged, all the records vanished, and they did not have time to record them all over again.

Soon after the debut single, Sabuha came out, Onur Ela decided to finish his professional musical career. Emre Aydın went solo, recording Afili Yalnızlık with GRGDN, which became an overwhelming hit.

In 2019 they released a new album called Uyut Beni.

Discography
6. Cadde (2003)
 Sabuha
 Yine de sen
 Git
 Çığlık Çığlığa
 Koyver Gitsin
 Dönersen
 Kör Talih
 Rüyamdaki Aptal Kadın
 Geçen Cuma
 Çalma açmam kapıyı
 Sen ve ben
 Sabuha 2
 Dönersen (Akustik)

Uyut Beni (2019)
 Yalan
 Uyut Beni
 Güllerim Soldu
 Sen Ve Ben
 Sen De Beni Hatırla
 Dönersen (feat. Onur Ela)
 Rüyamdaki Aptal Kadın
 Şehir
 Beni Bırakma (feat. Kaan Beyru)

External links
 Emre AYDIN official site

References

Turkish alternative rock groups